Faith branding is the concept of branding religious organizations, leaders, or media programming, in the hope of penetrating a media-driven, consumer-oriented culture more effectively. Faith branding treats faith as a product and attempts to apply the principles of marketing in order to "sell" the product. Faith branding is a response to the challenge that religious organizations and leaders face regarding how to express their faith in a media-dominated culture.

References

Sources
Ministry Today: The Art of Branding

Further reading
 
 
 

Types of branding